The TNA 2004 America's X Cup Tournament was a tournament that was hosted by Total Nonstop Action Wrestling. It was the forerunner to the TNA 2004 World X Cup Tournament. America's X Cup Tournament consisted of four Teams: Team USA (representing the National Wrestling Alliance/Total Nonstop Action Wrestling), Team Canada, Team Mexico (representing AAA), and Team Britain.

History
Throughout America's X Cup Tournament, AAA's Team Mexico was extremely successful and dominant. They defeated Team USA, Team UK, and Team Canada. At the end of the tournament, Team AAA was victorious, upsetting the American Team and winning the trophy that Team USA was to defend. After America's X Cup Tournament ended, the World X Cup immediately followed. The World X Cup saw Team USA make a strong comeback. The World X Cup eventually culminated in an Ultimate X match which featured Team USA's Chris Sabin, Team Canada's Petey Williams, and Team Mexico's Hector Garza. Sabin won both the match and the tournament for Team USA.

Teams and Members

Team NWA/USA
 Jerry Lynn (Captain)
 Chris Sabin
 Elix Skipper
 Sonjay Dutt

Team Canada
 Teddy Hart (Captain)
 Jack Evans
 Johnny Devine
 Petey Williams

Team AAA/Mexico
 Juventud Guerrera (Captain – I & II)
 Héctor Garza (Captain – III)
 Abismo Negro
 Mr. Águila
 Heavy Metal

Team Britain/UK
 James Mason (Captain)
 Robbie Dynamite
 Xtreme Dean Allmark
 Frankie Sloan

Americas X Cup I
America's X Cup I took place on February 11, 2004. The tournament featured Team AAA and Team NWA facing off in the first ever tournament. The teams were captained by Juventud Guerrera representing Team AAA and Jerry Lynn representing Team NWA.

See also
TNA X Cup Tournaments
TNA 2003 Super X Cup Tournament
TNA 2004 World X Cup Tournament
TNA 2005 Super X Cup Tournament
TNA 2006 World X Cup Tournament
TNA 2008 World X Cup Tournament

References

External links
TNAWrestling.com (Official Website of TNA Wrestling)
Impact Wrestling tournaments
2004 in professional wrestling